Nirvendra Kumar Mishra, also known as Munna, (1944/1945–2020) was an Indian politician. He was a member of the Samajwadi Party and a member of the Uttar Pradesh Legislative Assembly representing Nighasan constituency. He died on 6 September 2020 in Lakhimpur Kheri.

Political career 
Mishra was a three-time MLA from Nighasan Assembly seat of Lakhimpur Kheri. He won twice as an independent candidate from November 1989 to 1992 and once on Samajwadi Party ticket from 1993 to 1995.

Death 
Mishra was allegedly beaten to death by rivals over a property dispute on 6 September 2020 at Trikaulia Padhua locality under Sampurnanagar police station area of the Lakhimpur Kheri district. However, police said that the former MLA's body did not bear any injury marks therefore it cannot be established if he was beaten to death.

References 

1940s births
Year of birth uncertain
Uttar Pradesh MLAs 1989–1991
Uttar Pradesh MLAs 1993–1996
Samajwadi Party politicians
Uttar Pradesh politicians
2020 deaths
Samajwadi Party politicians from Uttar Pradesh